Henry James Ruggs III (born January 24, 1999) is an American football wide receiver who is a free agent. He played college football at the University of Alabama, where he was a member of the team that won the 2018 College Football Playoff National Championship. Ruggs was selected by the Raiders in the first round of the 2020 NFL Draft.

During his second season, Ruggs caused a car crash that killed a 23-year-old woman. He was released by the Raiders the same day. As of February 2023, Ruggs is awaiting trial on charges of driving under the influence (DUI) resulting in death and reckless driving.

Early years
Henry James Ruggs III grew up in Montgomery, Alabama. In the eighth grade, Ruggs was promoted to the varsity football team for the final two games of their season. He attended Robert E. Lee High School. Ruggs did not play high school football until his junior year and received his first scholarship offer after just his second game on the gridiron. As a senior, he had 38 catches for 639 yards in nine games. He scored 20 touchdowns: nine catches, seven rushes, three passes, and one kick return. Ruggs also played basketball and ran track in high school; his 100-meter dash time of 10.58 seconds is the Alabama High School Athletic Association's class 7A record. In 2017, 247Sports.com ranked Ruggs as the second-best high school football player in Alabama. Ruggs received scholarship offers from more than 20 colleges to play football; he chose the University of Alabama.

College career
As a true freshman at Alabama in 2017, Ruggs had 12 receptions for 229 yards and six touchdowns. As a true sophomore in 2018, he had 46 receptions for 741 yards and 11 touchdowns. As a true junior in 2019, he had 40 receptions for 746 receiving yards and seven receiving touchdowns. During his junior season, Ruggs was also the team's primary kick returner and averaged 23.8 yards per return. His 24 total career receiving touchdowns places him third on Alabama's all-time leaderboard. On January 6, 2020, Ruggs announced that he would forgo his true senior year and enter the 2020 NFL Draft.

College statistics

Professional career

Ruggs ran a 4.27-second 40-yard dash at the 2020 NFL Combine; that was the year's fastest time by any prospect by .08 seconds, and it tied for the fourth-fastest ever at the event since electronic timing began in 1999. Ruggs' vertical jump was measured 42 inches, tied for second-best among wide receivers at the 2020 combine.

At the 2020 NFL Draft, Ruggs was the first wide receiver to be drafted. The Las Vegas Raiders selected him with the 12th overall pick, their first since moving from Oakland earlier in the year. Ruggs was also the Raiders’ second consecutive first-round pick of a player from the University of Alabama, joining 2019 first round running back Josh Jacobs. On July 21, 2020, Ruggs signed a fully guaranteed four-year contract worth $16.67 million, with a team option for a fifth year.

2020
On September 13, 2020, Ruggs made his NFL debut in the season opener against the Carolina Panthers, including making his first career catch. During Week 5 against the Kansas City Chiefs, Ruggs recorded his first 100-yard game, with 118 receiving yards, which included his first career touchdown, a 72-yard reception. He was placed on the reserve/COVID-19 list by the team on December 15, 2020, and activated on December 24. Ruggs finished his rookie year with 26 receptions, 452 receiving yards, and two touchdowns in 13 games played.

2021
In the 2021 season, Ruggs had 24 receptions, 469 receiving yards, and two touchdowns in seven games.

Ruggs was released on November 2, 2021, following allegations of driving under the influence that led to a fatality. His two-season stint with the Raiders totaled 20 games, 1,197 all-purpose yards, and four touchdowns.

NFL career statistics

Personal life 
Ruggs credits his friend Roderic Scott with encouraging him to play football in high school. Scott died in a car crash at 17 years of age, and Ruggs would honor him with a three-fingered salute after every touchdown because Scott wore number 3 on the basketball court. Ruggs’ brother Kevontae played college football for Ole Miss in 2018 before transferring to East Mississippi Community College in 2019. In April 2020, Henry Ruggs partnered with Three Square, a southern Nevada food bank, to donate meals to those in need because of the COVID-19 pandemic. On May 7, 2020, Ruggs’ daughter was born to his long-term girlfriend Rudy Washington.

2021 fatal car crash
On November 2, 2021, Ruggs rear-ended another car at high speed in Las Vegas, 23-year-old Tina Tintor and her dog burned to death in the fatal car accident according to Las Vegas police and county prosecutors. Ruggs has been charged with driving under the influence resulting in death and reckless driving.

Hours before the incident, Ruggs and his girlfriend, Kiara Kilgo-Washington, were seen drinking at a Topgolf location in Las Vegas. They left after midnight in his heavily modified Chevrolet Corvette Stingray (which he nicknamed "Lizzy"). The Clark County Coroner determined that Tintor and her dog burned to death as her vehicle was engulfed in flames following the collision.

Ruggs and Kilgo-Washington were transported to the University Medical Center of Southern Nevada (UMCSN) with non-life-threatening injuries.

Legal proceedings
Upon his release from the hospital, the Las Vegas Metropolitan Police Department booked him into the Clark County Detention Center. Ruggs appeared in court the following day, and Judge Joe M. Bonaventure set bail at $150,000. On March 10, 2022, a judge postponed Ruggs' preliminary hearing until May 19, with Ruggs' attorney stating that various inspections still needed to be done. If convicted, he faces 3 to 26 years in prison and up to $10,000 in fines, 2–20 years for the fatal DUI crash, 1–6 years for reckless driving causing death, and up to $5,000 in fines for each.

Police reports show Ruggs had refused to take a field sobriety test, and his blood test was taken 2 hours following the crash, revealing a blood alcohol content of 0.161%, more than twice the legal limit in Nevada. Ruggs defense attorney, David Chesnoff, argued that Ruggs was unable to submit a field sobriety test because of his injuries sustained in the accident, and claimed that the blood test should not be admissible as evidence since the police did not have probable cause to obtain a blood test. Justice of the Peace Ann Zimmerman rejected Chesnoff's arguments and ruled that the blood test is admissible as evidence in the case.

Response
The Las Vegas Raiders released Ruggs later on November 2, 2021.

Various football players and coaches made public statements. Derek Carr, a former Raiders teammate, said Ruggs needs to be loved and that "if no one else will do it, I'll do it". Ex-Raiders interim head coach Rich Bisaccia said, "We want to express our sincere condolences to the victim's family". Kadarius Toney of the New York Giants drew criticism for seeming to ignore the gravity of the situation and excuse Ruggs when he tweeted, "We young…..everybody make mistakes… he know he messed up don’t drag em for it……that's goofy to me…." Nick Saban, who coached Ruggs on the Alabama Crimson Tide college football team, said, "We're going to support him through it, but we also have a lot of compassion for the victims, and our thoughts and prayers are also with them." Quarterbacks Tua Tagovailoa and Jalen Hurts, who both played with Ruggs at Alabama, also spoke on the matter. Tagovailoa said, "You'd never think this guy could hurt a soul, so when you see something like that – I mean, I'm still kind of in disbelief. But, obviously my heart goes out to the family that has been affected by it. But my heart also goes out to Henry as my teammate, ex-teammate." Hurts said, "It's unfortunate to see a situation like that unfold, and I'll just kind of leave it at that. It hurts my heart for everybody involved."

See also
Jeff Alm
Josh Brent

References

External links
Twitter
Las Vegas Raiders bio 
Alabama Crimson Tide bio

Living people
1999 births
Players of American football from Montgomery, Alabama
American football wide receivers
Alabama Crimson Tide football players
Las Vegas Raiders players